Boston Latin Academy (BLA) is a public exam school founded in 1878 in Boston, Massachusetts providing students in grades 7th through 12th a classical preparatory education.

Originally named Girls' Latin School until 1977, the school was the first college preparatory high school for girls in the United States.  Now coeducational, the school is located in the Roxbury neighborhood of Boston and is part of Boston Public Schools (BPS).

History
Boston Latin Academy (BLA) was established on November 27, 1877 as Girls' Latin School (GLS). The school was founded with the intention to give a classical education and college preparatory training to girls. A plan to admit girls to Public Latin School was formed by an executive committee of the Massachusetts Society for the University Education of Women. Three visionary and driving members of this executive committee, Emily Talbot, Florence Cushing, and Annie Fields deserve much of the credit for the school's founding. Henry Fowle Durant, founder of Wellesley College and an advocate of higher education for women, was instrumental in outlining the legal route for the school to be established. A petition with a thousand signatures was presented to the School Board in September 1877. The board referred the question to the subcommittee on high schools. Meanwhile, Emily Talbot met with the headmaster of Public Latin School and asked that her daughter and another girl be admitted. Although Headmaster Moses Merrill was willing to teach the girls, he thought it best to wait for the subcommittee's decision. Ultimately the subcommittee recommended that a separate school for girls be established. John Tetlow was unanimously elected by the School Committee on January 22, 1878 as its first headmaster. On February 4, 1878, Tetlow accepted the first thirty-seven students.

Girls' Latin School opened on West Newton Street in Boston's South End on February 12, 1878. The thirty-seven students were divided according to aptitude into three classes; the Sixth, Fifth, and Third class. The first graduating class in 1880 included Alice M. Mills, Charlotte W. Rogers, Vida D. Scudder, Mary L. Mason, Alice S. Rollins, and Miriam S. Witherspoon; all six were accepted to Smith College.

In 1888, Abbie Farwell Brown, Sybil Collar, and Virginia Holbrook decided to create a school newspaper. The name Jabberwock was picked from a list that Abbie Farwell Brown submitted. It was taken from "Jabberwocky", the famous nonsense poem written by Lewis Carroll in Through the Looking Glass. They wrote to Lewis Carroll in London about the name and received a handwritten letter giving them permission for its use. The Jabberwock is one of the oldest school newspapers in the United States.

The number of students grew each year. When the number of students exceeded 350 in 1898, the school committee moved the first four classes to a building in Copley Square vacated by the Chauncy Hall School while the fifth and sixth remained in the old building. In 1907, Girls' Latin School moved into a brand new building, shared with the Boston Normal School, located on Huntington Avenue in the Fenway.

The school remained there until 1955, when Teachers' College expanded, forcing Girls' Latin School to relocate to the former Dorchester High School for Girls building located in Codman Square.

In 1972, boys were admitted for the first time to Girls' Latin School. The school name was changed in 1975 and the first graduating class of Boston Latin Academy was in 1977.

In 1981, Latin Academy moved back into the Fenway area, this time to Ipswich Street, across from Fenway Park. It remained there until the summer of 1991, when it moved back again, this time to its present location in the former Roxbury Memorial and Boston Technical High School building, located on Townsend St. in Roxbury.

In 2001, Boston Latin Academy became the first high school to form an official Eastern Massachusetts High School Red Cross Club. The club is one of the biggest in the school with over 100 members. Latin Academy's Red Cross Club is also one of the biggest high school Red Cross Club in Eastern Massachusetts.

94% of its graduating students go on to attend four-year colleges. In 2010 Boston Latin Academy received a Silver Medal as one of the top public high schools in the nation by U.S. News & World Report.

Admissions
Entrance is allowed in the 7th and 9th grades.  To gain admission to BLA, a student must be a resident of Boston and must take the ISEE test, at the Middle, or Upper Level. Admission is granted based on the student's grade point average (GPA) and ISEE Score, with equal weight given to both.

Heads of School
The title of the school’s chief administrator was changed from "Headmaster" to "Head of School" during the 2020-2021 school year.

 John Tetlow (1878–1910)
 Ernest J. Hapgood (1910–1948)
 Louis A. McCoy (1948–1957)
 Thomas F. Gately (1957–1965)
 William T. Miller (1965–1966)
 Margaret C. Carroll (1966–1978)
 M. Louise Dooley (acting, 1978-1979)
Christopher Lane (1979–1981)
 Douglas Foster (1981–1983)
 Robert Binswanger (1983–1991)
 Maria Garcia-Aaronson (1991–2009)
 Emilia Pastor (2010–2014; 2014–2015)
 Richard Sullivan (acting, 2014)
 Troy Henninger (2015–2017)
 Chimdi Uchendu (2017–2020 )
 Gerald Howland (acting, 2020-2021)
 Gavin Smith (2021–present)

Buildings

West Newton Street South End, Boston

After Girls' Latin School was approved on November 27, 1877, the first classes were held on February 12, 1878. Girls' Latin shared its first building with Girls' High School. Built from 1869 through 1871, the school was at the time of its completion, the largest in New England and the most expensive school built in the United States.  It occupied a  lot fronting on West Newton Street in the South End. West Newton Street was bounded on the north by Pembroke Street and on the west and east by Tremont and Shawmut Streets. In 1878, West Newton Street was a wide, dirt street and the sidewalks were brick. The Evangelical  Zionist Church was to the left of the school and to the right was a row of brick townhouses with classic Bostonian double-bowed fronts.

The school was limestone block on the street level and red brick on the upper three stories. A set of granite stairs bridged the side walk up to the door. The turreted roof was unusually decorative and had a Faneuil Hall like cupola tower on top. It contained sixty six classrooms; seven rooms providing seating for one hundred students and the smallest four rooms seating seventy-five.

In December 1882, the school committee voted to expand the classrooms for GLS and approved the use of six rooms on the second floor and one room on the third floor of Girls' High. They also appropriated $2,000 so that the school could be physically separated or isolated from Girls' High. They erected partitions, assigned separate entrances, and purchased $1,500 of additional furnishings. The entire west half of the second floor was "appropriated to the exclusive use of the school."

Enrollment at GLS had grown from 37 in 1878 to 296 in 1896. The West Newton Street building was becoming far too small to accommodate both schools. Every available recitation room in the school had been filled with desks, the drawing and musical rooms in the attic and basement, even the cloak-rooms had been converted for use. The school built for 925 girls, was approaching 1,300 students.

However, Girls' Latin would occupy the building on West Newton Street from 1878 to 1907; almost thirty years. The building was razed in 1960 and a playground now occupies its site on West Newton Street.

Chauncy Hall, 1898–1907

In February 1898, the first through fourth classes, approximately 240 students, were moved to the Chauncy Hall School in Copley Square which had been vacated by the private school two years earlier. Headmaster John Tetlow summed, "The present transfer of the main part of Girls' Latin School to an independent building is rightly viewed by the friends of the school as a subject for congratulations ... but let it be remembered that this transfer is only one step toward the consummation to be striven for. ... The school needs, for adequate performance of its mission in the community, a new and well equipped building."

Located at 593–597 Boylston Street between Dartmouth and Clarendon directly across from Trinity Church, the building was stone with three spires and an ivy covered façade.

The Chauncy Hall School was established in 1828 by Gideon F. Thayer and was originally located on Chauncy Place in Boston. The school burned to the ground in May 1873. The decision was made to re-build a new school. "Fortunately our attention was directed to the neighborhood of what is now Copley Square, and though it seemed somewhat out-of-town, it was thought best to take the risk of the city growing in that direction," wrote historian Thomas Cushing. "The estimated cost was $100,000, and school masters do not usually have that sum at command to embody their wishes in brick and mortar." A stock company was formed of approximately 160 former pupils and parents of current pupils, including Dr. Israel Tisdale Talbot. The school paid the stockholders annual rent until the school relocated in 1896. When the decision was made to transfer the upper four grades to the empty building, the City of Boston entered into agreement to lease the building from the Chauncy Hall Association for annual rent and taxes of $8,708.

The third floor contained a 400-seat hall, and the first two floors, 12 classrooms. From the beginning, the school was thought unsuitable being too dark, noisy (from the constant stream of electrically powered street cars) and too far from West Newton Street. The remaining fifth and sixth classes walked the two mile (3 km) round trip twice each month to attend school assemblies.

Huntington Avenue, 1907–1955
Located on Huntington Avenue the Fenway, Boston, and the first and only building built for GLS.

On November 11, 1902, the Committee on High Schools ordered that the Board of Commissioners, "purchase a site and erect a building for Girls' Latin, at the earliest possible date.” This order was expanded to include within the same complex the Normal School and a new grammar school

The new building for Girls' Latin School was ready for the beginning of the 1907 school year. The Girls' Latin and Normal School group was completed at a cost of $978,181.The two acre plus lot (113,181 square feet) fronted on Evans Way and Huntington Avenue, was bounded by Tetlow Street on the north (named in honor of its head master), Longwood Avenue on the south and Worthington on the west (later this was renamed Palace Road).

Three architectural firms had collaborated on the design of the building; Peabody & Stearns, Coolidge & Carlson and Maginnis, Walsh and Sullivan. The buildings were red brick with terra cotta and limestone trim and included all the latest advances in electricity and heating. Although the electric light bulb had been invented in 1879, new completely electric buildings were still somewhat of a novelty. For the first time, the school had working telephones with service provided by New England Telephone and Telegraph Company and other new "telephonic services" including switchboard, desk telephones, clocks and bells.

Over the door leading to the courtyard were inscribed the words in Latin, "Here is an open field for talent; appreciative recognition is assured to the deserving; diligent application is honored with due rewards."

The average classroom was much smaller, and held approximately 56 desks. New features had been introduced like "battery blackboards" that provided more than one surface of natural slate and slid up and down like windows; wall maps and wall charts. The new chemistry and botany labs also had soapstone sinks and hoods to remove odors.

In 1922, Boston Latin School relocated from Warren Avenue to a new Boston Latin School on Avenue Louis Pasteur. Constructed at a cost of $950,000, the building was dedicated on May 18, 1923. The rear yards of Boston Latin and Girls' Latin were separated only by a street named Palace Road.

Girls' Latin School expanded from approximately 421 students in 1907 to over 1,200 students in 1955 within the Huntington Avenue building.

In 1924, The  Normal School became The Teachers College of the City of Boston. The Massachusetts Board of Education took over the responsibility of operating this teacher's college to provide financial relief to the City of Boston. In return, the City of Boston agreed to deed the entire Huntington Avenue Building including the Girls' Latin School buildings and the park area in front to the State.

On August 12, 1952, Girls' Latin School's building was transferred to the state for $1.00; approved by the Mayor John B. Hynes and 4/5ths of school committee. Teachers College of the City of Boston became the State Teachers College at Boston. The State Board of Education entered into a "Use Permit" with the City of Boston so that GLS could rent the property for classes until June 30, 1953 with the understanding that by 1955, "that some provision would be made for the housing of the school in other school property in the City of Boston." In January 1955, the School Committee asked the State to extend the "Use Permit" but they refused despite the protests of prominent citizens and vigorous efforts by the alumnae.

On Friday June 24, 1955 the final day of classes was held at the building.

In 1983, The Massachusetts College of Art took over the Girls' Latin School and Normal School buildings and began a program of renovation and new construction. The original entrance to Girls' Latin was altered to allow the construction of a new thirteen story Tower Building; however, Girls' Latin School Building remains intact behind the Tower. The assembly hall was recently renamed The Pozen Center.

Codman Square, 1955–1981
Talbot Avenue Codman Square, Dorchester

The next home of GLS, the Dorchester High School building in Codman Square, was originally completed in 1901 and it had been in use for over five decades. The Codman Square building sat on a tight triangle of land, the apex extending out to the middle of the square at Washington Street; one triangle side being Talbot Avenue and the other, Centre Street. The land was purchased in 1896, but construction did not start for two years due to the difficult shape of the  site. The first proposed school building was rejected. The approved design was by Hartwell, Richardson & Driver was Renaissance revival in style. The building's exterior was a distinctive yellow brick called buff brick, accented by limestone lintels and trim.  On each of four floors, a wide main corridor ran the length of the building parallel to Talbot Avenue. Two broad sets of ornamental stairs extended from the basement to the fourth floor.

In the basement was a lunch room, 900 lockers and to the rear of the building, a gym. Over the gym on the second floor level was the assembly hall which could seat 1,000. At the front there was a stage and two anterooms and at the rear a large balcony. Arched timbers were exposed in the ceiling.

On the first floor was the headmaster's office, reception office, and several classrooms. The second floor held the library. Both the second and third floor had many classrooms as well as fully equipped laboratories. The fourth floor had two art rooms. There were 58 classrooms total.

Codman Square was closed in 1981 and the school was transferred to Ipswich Street, a former warehouse for the US Postal Service. The Codman Square school sat vacant for a few years. Then in 1986, most of the classrooms in the building were converted into housing by private developer Robert Walsh. The Codman Square Neighborhood Development Corporation completed renovation of the historic Girls' Latin Academy building in April, 2008. In addition to renovating (and financially re-structuring) the existing 58 housing units, thirty-five new affordable rental units were added in the vacant portions of the school building the gym and the auditorium. This completed the adaptive re-use of this Codman Square landmark. The former Girls' Latin School and first home of Boston Latin Academy remains one of the three historic buildings in the Codman Square Historic District.

174 Ipswich Street
From 1981 to 1991, the school was located at 174 Ipswich Street in Boston. The building has continued to be used for education since BLA was relocated.

The top of the gold bricked building is often seen on camera during Red Sox games, just past Pesky's Pole in right field.  BLA students would frequently be let out early on the home opener of the season to avoid being caught in the heavy congestion that normally accompanies home games at Fenway Park.

205 Townsend Street

Since 1991, the school has been located at 205 Townsend Street in Roxbury, in the former home of the Roxbury Memorial High School, and later Boston Technical High School.

Notable alumni
 Florence Adelaide Fowle Adams (b. 1863), GLS class of ca. 1881; dramatic reader, actor, and teacher
 Barbara Henry (b. 1932), a retired American teacher most notable for teaching Ruby Bridges, the first African-American child to attend the all-white William Frantz Elementary School, located in New Orleans.
 Ellen Swepson Jackson (1935-2005), pioneer of Boston school desegregation
 Maud Worcester Makemson, GLS Class of 1908; astronomer, director of Vassar Observatory
 Mary McGrory (1918-2004), journalist on Nixon's Enemies List.
 Hannah Myrick, GLS Class of 1892; physician, superintendent of New England Hospital for Women and Children
 Josephine Preston Peabody, GLS Class of 1892(?); poet and dramatist
 G. Yvonne Young, GLS Class of 1947; woman engineering pioneer working at NASA and Tennessee State University
 Nathan Blecharczyk, BLA Class of 2001; co-founder and Chief Strategy Officer of Airbnb
Lorraine O'Grady, GLS Class of 1952; conceptual and performance artist
Dorothy Quiggle (1903-1993), class of 1922, MIT Chemical Engineering BSc, MSc, Penn State PhD and professor of chemical engineering.
Ida Shaw Martin (1867-1940), Founder of the Delta Delta Delta sorority

Athletics
Currently Latin Academy offers a wide variety of sports. The team mascot is the Jabberwock, but in recent years it has changed to the Dragon.

 Football
 Boys soccer
 Girls soccer
 Boys volleyball
 Girls volleyball
 Indoor track and field
 Outdoor track and field
 Cross country
 Girls basketball
 Boys basketball
 Girls hockey
 Boys hockey
 Boys baseball
 Girls softball
 Cheerleading
 Boys tennis
 Girls tennis
 Co-Ed swim

See also

 John D. O'Bryant School of Mathematics & Science

References

External links

 Boston Latin Academy official website
 Girls' Latin School Boston Latin Academy Association
 Boston Public Schools' Profile PDF for Boston Latin Academy
 
 Records of the Girls' Latin School/Boston Latin Academy Association, 1883-2017: A Finding Aid. Schlesinger Library, Radcliffe Institute, Harvard University.
 Papers of Lucile Lord-Heinstein, 1895-1977: A Finding Aid. Schlesinger Library, Radcliffe Institute, Harvard University.
 Papers of Natalie Walker Linderholm, 1900-1984: A Finding Aid. Schlesinger Library, Radcliffe Institute, Harvard University.

1877 establishments in Massachusetts
Educational institutions established in 1877
High schools in Boston
Middle schools in Boston
Preparatory schools in Massachusetts
Public middle schools in Massachusetts
Public high schools in Massachusetts
Public preparatory schools in the United States